Aigas Field Centre is a nature centre based at the home of naturalist and author Sir John Lister-Kaye, Aigas House. The centre was opened in 1977 by ecologist Sir Frank Fraser Darling, and provides nature-based holidays for adults and environmental education services for school children.

House of Aigas, once a Victorian sporting estate, was owned by the Gordon-Oswalds, who added the Victorian extensions to what was an 18th-century tacksmans house. The house was then owned by Inverness County Council as an old people's home, before Lister-Kaye persuaded them to sell it to him.

Aigas began a beaver demonstration project in 2006. Two Eurasian beavers were released into a 200-acre enclosure, which includes a loch and surrounding woodland. The beavers have since built lodges and had a number of kits.

Aigas was host to a series of the BBC's live-action nature documentary, Autumnwatch in October 2012 and Winterwatch in January 2013.

House of Aigas and Field Centre is the Highlands leading provider of wildlife holidays and their charitable arm, The Aigas Trust for Environmental Education, hosts over 5,000 school children a year.

References

External links
 Aigas Field Centre website

Nature centres in Scotland
Tourist attractions in Highland (council area)
Field studies centres in the United Kingdom